Secrets of the Lost Satellite Tour, Spring 2007 is the 2007 live album from Ken Andrews Secrets of the Lost Satellite tour.

Track listing
"Stuck On You"
"In Your Way"
"Up Or Down"
"Secret Things"
"Write Your Story"
"C'mon Collapse"
"Soluble Words"
"Hunted"
"Absent Stars"
"Undone"
"Sergeant Politeness"
"Without"
"The Nurse Who Loved Me"
"Daylight"

Ken Andrews albums
2007 live albums